Cemil Çıpa (born 22 January 1988 in Istanbul) is a Turkish former race driver, who competed in one season of the Formula 3 Euro Series in the Drivers' Trophy and finished in third before he quit from racing at the end of 2006, aged just 18. In 2005 he won Formula 3 Turkey after graduating from karting in 2004. His karting career saw him clinch four titles in Junior category.

References

Turkish racing drivers
1988 births
Living people
Sportspeople from Istanbul
21st-century Turkish people